Major William Whitehead Hicks Beach (23 March 1907 – 1 January 1975) was a Conservative politician in the United Kingdom.  He was Member of Parliament for Cheltenham from 1950 to 1964 and was also an Alderman of Cheltenham Borough Council.

Life
The son of Ellis Hicks Beach (1874–1943) by his marriage to Nancy Whitehead, he was the grandson of William Frederick Hicks-Beach (1841–1923), a younger brother of Michael Hicks Beach, 1st Earl St Aldwyn.

He was promoted to Captain in the Territorial Army  Royal Armoured Corps 

On 12 September 1939 Hicks-Beach married Diana Hoare (1911–2002), a daughter of Christopher Gurney Hoare, and they had two daughters, Elizabeth (later Mrs Hinson) and Rosemary (later Mrs Naylor), and one son, Mark Hicks Beach (1943–1998).

He is buried in the churchyard of St Mary's, Great Witcombe, Gloucestershire.

A road on the Hesters Way housing estate in Cheltenham is named after him.

Notes

References

External links 
 

1907 births
1975 deaths
Conservative Party (UK) MPs for English constituencies
UK MPs 1950–1951
UK MPs 1951–1955
UK MPs 1955–1959
UK MPs 1959–1964
William Whitehead
Councillors in Gloucestershire
Politics of Cheltenham